Bald Bluff (also Baldbluff) is an unincorporated community, in Bald Bluff Township, Henderson County, Illinois, United States.

Notable people
Guy C. Scott, Chief Justice of the Illinois Supreme Court, was born in Bald Bluff.

Notes

Unincorporated communities in Henderson County, Illinois
Unincorporated communities in Illinois